Rasul Khan  was one of the finest generals of Ismael Adil Shah, the Sultan of Bijapur.

Taking of Goa
In 1512, he was asked to lead an army to reconquer Goa from the Portuguese. A previous army under the command of Fulad Khan was well ensconced in the nearby fortress of Banastarim and had repelled several Portuguese attacks, but had made little progress in Goa's capture from Afonso de Albuquerque.

Rasul Khan marched with a strong army to Goa, but Fulad Khan refused to acknowledge his supremacy. The canny Rasul Khan then appealed to the Portuguese for help against his insubordinate officer, and the commandant of Goa Diogo Mendes was foolish enough to give it. With the help of the Portuguese themselves, Rasul Khan drove Fulad Khan out of Banastarim and, once he had taken possession of the fort, demanded the surrender of Goa. He besieged Goa and cut off all food supplies. But still the starving city held firm.

Albuquerque had returned from his capture of Malacca to Cochin, but could not sail to Goa because of the monsoon and because of insufficient forces at his command, as the Portuguese commanders of Cochin and Cannanore refused to help him. The arrival of Dom Garcia de Noronha with six ships and a further squadron of eight ships under Jorge de Mello Pereira, both fleets carrying a large number of soldiers, boosted his resolve.
 
On 10 September 1512, Albuquerque set sail from Cochin with fourteen ships carrying 1,700 Portuguese soldiers. Once he entered the harbour of Goa, he sent six ships to bombard the fort of Banastarim and cut off Rasul Khan's communications with the hinterland.

Hearing that Rasul Khan had marched out of the fort towards the city at the head of 3,000 men, he divided his infantry into three divisions. His cavalry was only 30 troopers, but owing to his skilful tactics, Rasul Khan's forces were attacked simultaneously in front and on both flanks. After a short but fierce battle, Rasul Khan's forces retreated into the fort of Banastarim. The Portuguese tried to follow them, but it proved impossible to capture the castle by escalade, and Albuquerque ordered a retreat to Goa.

Albuquerque, determined to capture the fortress, ordered trenches to be dug and a wall to be breached. But on the very morning of the planned final assault, Rasul Khan hung out the white flag. Albuquerque demanded that the fort be surrendered with all its artillery, ammunition and horses, and the deserters in Rasul Khan's camp be given up to him.

Rasul Khan consented, but only on condition that the lives of the deserters should be spared. Albuquerque agreed, and Rasul Khan evacuated the Banastarim fort, leaving Goa entirely in the hands of the Portuguese.

Albuquerque's timing was impeccable. As Rasul Khan retired with his disarmed troops, he met a strong reinforcement from Bijapur under the command of Yusaf-ul-Araj. But it was too late, and they retired to  Bijapur.

Albuquerque's cruelty to the Portuguese deserters who fell into his hands is well known. Some of them had joined Rasul Khan when the Portuguese were forced to flee Goa by the Adil Shahi forces in May 1510. The others had left Goa during the recent siege.

Having promised to spare their lives, Albuquerque kept his word. But he mutilated them horribly, cutting off their ears, noses, right hands, and the thumbs of their left hands, as well as pulling out all their hair. The most well known of these renegades was a minor fidalgo named Fernão Lopes. He was similarly mutilated, and put on board a ship bound for Portugal in custody. He escaped while the ship was watering at the island of Saint Helena, and led a 'Robinson Crusoe' life there for many years.

References

Bibliography 
 Robert Sewell, A Forgotten Empire (Vijayanagar). A Contribution to the History of India, Adamant Media Corporation, p. 351, 

16th-century Indian monarchs
Bijapur
16th-century Indian Muslims
S
History of Karnataka
History of Goa